The following highways are/were numbered 932:

Ireland
  R932 regional road

United States